James Dunn is a retired American soccer defender who was the 2000 and 2001 National Professional Soccer League Defender of the Year.  He also played in the American Professional Soccer League and the Continental Indoor Soccer League.

Youth
Dunn, twin brother of Jason Dunn, graduated from North Thurston High School where he won the 1990 Class AAA High School soccer championship.  In 1990, he played a single season with the University of Washington men’s soccer team.  He then transferred to Seattle Pacific University, playing on the men’s soccer team there from 1991 to 1993.

Professional
In 1994, Dunn signed with the Seattle Sounders of the American Professional Soccer League.  The Sounders topped the table, but fell to the Colorado Foxes in the first round of the playoffs.  Dunn was named Second Team All League.  In 1995 and 1996, the Sounders won the league championship.  In 1997, the Seattle SeaDogs selected Dunn in the fourth round (twenty-sixth overall) of the Continental Indoor Soccer League draft.  He chose to move to the Carolina Dynamo instead.  However, at the end of the 1997 A-League season, in which the Dynamo fell to the Milwaukee Rampage in the championship, Dunn joined the SeaDogs.  The SeaDogs won the CISL championship, giving Dunn his third title in four seasons.  In 1998, Dunn signed with the Florida ThunderCats of the National Professional Soccer League.

On March 15, 1999, the Thundercats sent Dunn to the Wichita Wings in exchange for Larry Inlow and Kevin Law.  He played seven games for the Wings at the end of the season.  In 2000 and 2001, Dunn was the NPSL Defender of the Year.  The Wings folded in 2001.

References

1971 births
Living people
Twin sportspeople
Soccer players from Washington (state)
American soccer players
Association football defenders
Washington Huskies men's soccer players
Seattle Pacific Falcons men's soccer players
Seattle Sounders (1994–2008) players
North Carolina Fusion U23 players
Seattle SeaDogs players
Florida ThunderCats players
Wichita Wings (NPSL) players
American Professional Soccer League players
Continental Indoor Soccer League players
National Professional Soccer League (1984–2001) players